Karl Johan Sigurd Svensson (27 September 1912 – 13 January 1969) was a Swedish horse rider who competed in the 1948 Summer Olympics. He and his horse Dust finished fifteenth in the individual eventing competition and won a silver medal with the Swedish eventing team.

References

1912 births
1969 deaths
Swedish event riders
Olympic equestrians of Sweden
Swedish male equestrians
Equestrians at the 1948 Summer Olympics
Olympic silver medalists for Sweden
Olympic medalists in equestrian
Medalists at the 1948 Summer Olympics
20th-century Swedish people